Elvira Teresa Cristi Bueno (born 26 November 1976) is a Chilean actress and model.

Biography
Elvira Cristi began her career at age 13, appearing in television commercials. She obtained the title of "Miss Rostro" (Miss Face) from the magazine  in 1994. At that time, she was 17 years old, studying at the Liceo Abdón Cifuentes in Santiago, from which she graduated as a secretary. She also made appearances on the Mega TV program . At 24, she was hired by an advertising agency in Mexico.

From 2004 to 2006, she appeared on other Mega youth series. She has gone on to perform in several Chilean fiction productions, including the 2017 feature film Cold Side and the 2019 telenovela Gemelas.

In 2015, she launched a line of shoes for Dafiti.

For eight years she was the romantic partner of Álvaro España, vocalist of the punk band Fiskales Ad-Hok.

In the early 2000s, Cristi became vegetarian, and two years later, vegan. However, she abandoned this practice in 2015 and is currently flexitarian.

Filmography

Telenovelas

TV series

Nonfiction TV programs
 Cocktel - Model
 Motín a bordo - Model
 Sal y pimineta - Model
 Contigo en verano - Model
 Viña Festival - Overture dancer
  - Games

Films

References

External links
 

1976 births
21st-century Chilean actresses
Actresses from Santiago
Chilean female models
Chilean film actresses
Chilean telenovela actresses
Living people